This is a list of members of the Western Australian Legislative Assembly between the 1950 election and the 1953 election, together known as the 20th Parliament.

Notes
 On 25 January 1951, the Independent member for Maylands, Harry Shearn, died. Liberal candidate Edward Oldfield won the resulting by-election on 17 February 1951.
 On 20 April 1951, the Labor member for South Fremantle, Thomas Fox, died. Labor candidate Dick Lawrence won the resulting by-election on 14 July 1951.
 On 9 July 1951, the Labor member for Gascoyne and former Premier Frank Wise resigned to take up an appointment as Administrator of the Northern Territory. Independent Liberal candidate Noel Butcher won the resulting by-election on 13 October 1951.
 On 16 August 1951, the Labor member for Boulder, Charlie Oliver, resigned. Labor candidate Arthur Moir was elected unopposed on 14 September 1951.
 On 25 December 1951, the Labor member for Leederville, Alexander Panton, died. Labor candidate Stephen Johnson won the resulting by-election on 9 February 1952.
 On 19 August 1952, the Labor member for Murchison, William Marshall, died. Labor candidate Everard O'Brien won the resulting by-election on 8 November 1952.

Members of Western Australian parliaments by term